Allegaeon  is an American extreme metal band from Fort Collins, Colorado, formed in 2008. They have released one EP and six studio albums.

History 
Allegaeon was formed in 2007. They initially played small shows, at bars and houses in and around Fort Collins. In August 2008 they independently released a self-titled EP. Soon after, they signed with Metal Blade Records. In January 2010, Allegaeon entered the studio to record their debut album Fragments of Form and Function. The album was released on July 20, 2010 through Metal Blade. In January 2012, Allegaeon went to Lambesis Studios in December 2011, in San Diego, California to record their second full-length album Formshifter. Formshifter was released May 8, 2012 through Metal Blade. In 2013, founding guitarist Ryan Glisan collaborated on a project with Tim Lambesis, and left the band shortly thereafter. He was replaced by Michael Stancel.

Their third full-length album, titled Elements of the Infinite, was released June 24, 2014 through Metal Blade. The album has been heavily praised, with Gregory Heaney of AllMusic calling it a "creative breakthrough" and praising "the dazzling guitar work" and "epic orchestral flourishes". In 2015, original vocalist Ezra Haynes departed Allegaeon, not citing a specific reason, though it is clear it was not because of internal band issues. Riley McShane was immediately selected to take over as vocalist, and has received a positive reaction from the fans.

In September 2016, Allegaeon released Proponent for Sentience, the first album with Riley and what was considered their finest work to date. It has received not only wide praise, but has been critically noted as having great importance in modern metal. It features Bjorn Strid of Soilwork on vocals and Benjamin Ellis of Scar Symmetry.

In October 2016, long time bass player Corey Archuleta announced he would be leaving the band at the end of the year to focus on his law career. During this time the band also stated they had incurred a large amount of debt, and were unsure how much longer the band would continue. Because of this financial stress, the band launched a fan club through the Patreon platform and have since been focused on continuing to tour and write their next album.

Also during 2016, Allegaeon shot studio play-through videos for the songs Gray Matter Mechanics and their cover of the Rush song Subdivisions, as well as an official video in California for the song "Of Mind and Matrix".

The band released a cover of Rush's song, "Animate", as a single on January 5, 2018; the cover was recorded during the Proponent for Sentience sessions. Allegaeon embarked on their first European tour later that year as a supporting act for Ne Obliviscaris.

In January 2019, Allegaeon announced a release date for their new album, Apoptosis, and released a new music video single for the song "Stellar Tidal Disruption". Apoptosis was released on April 19, 2019 through Metal Blade.

On April 3, 2020, the band released a cover of the 1971 song "Roundabout" by British progressive rock band Yes.

On October 27, 2021, they announced their new album Damnum with the release of its first single "Into Embers." The album was released on February 25, 2022.

On August 24, 2022, vocalist Riley McShane announced his departure from the band. On September 13, the band recruited original vocalist Ezra Haynes to perform with them on their upcoming European tour.

Musical style and lyrical themes 

Allegaeon combines different styles. They are often referred to as technical melodic death metal. They take influence from classical music, progressive metal and thrash metal as well. Lyrically, they deal with scientific themes, exploring things like the theory of evolution and biology, physics, cryonics, dyson spheres, the probability of alien life in the universe, stem cell research, and artificial intelligence. Allegaeon is also noted for their technicality, but by the time "Elements of the Infinite" was released, they had started incorporating more catchy elements in their music.

Tours 
Allegaeon has toured and played shows with other prominent bands, such as Job for a Cowboy, Darkest Hour and in 2014, they had their most intense touring schedule to date. In August, they embarked on a nationwide tour entitled "The Artery Metal Tour" supporting Chimaira and The Plot in You. Immediately after, in September 2014, Allegaeon played a string of shows directly supporting Arsis on the band's 10th Anniversary Tour. In the spring of 2015 the band toured with The Agonist and Product of Hate, and played SXSW with Norma Jean. Additionally, Allegaeon co-headlined a large tour with Act of Defiance, a metal supergroup featuring members of Megadeth, including guitarist Chris Broderick. In 2016, Allegaeon also played the Ozzfest meets Knotfest festival in San Bernardino, California and the Winter Warriors tour alongside Battlecross and Necromancing the Stone. The band started off 2017 by performing multiple sets on the 70,000 Tons of Metal cruise festival and followed up with performing the Metal Blade Records' 35th Anniversary tour with Whitechapel, Cattle Decapitation, and Goatwhore.

Band members

Current members
 Ezra Haynes – vocals (2008–2015, 2022–present)
 Greg Burgess – guitar (2008–present)
 Michael Stancel – guitar (2013–present)
 Brandon Michael – bass (2017–present)
 Jeff Saltzman – drums (2020–present)

Former members
 Corey Archuleta – bass (2008–2016)
 Ryan Glisan – rhythm guitar (2008–2013)
 Jordan Belfast – drums (2008–2011)
 J.P. Andrande – drums (2011–2013)
 Brandon Park – drums (2013–2020)
 Riley McShane – vocals (2015–2022)

Timeline

Discography 
Studio albums

EPs

Singles

Music videos

References

External links 
 

Musical groups established in 2008
American death metal musical groups
Heavy metal musical groups from Colorado
Metal Blade Records artists
2008 establishments in Colorado